Nakhchivan field is an offshore oil and gas field the Caspian Sea, Azerbaijan.

Nakhchivan deposit was discovered in 1960. It was prepared for drilling in 1994.  In 1997, ExxonMobil and the State Oil Company of Azerbaijan Republic (SOCAR) signed a contract for the exploration of the field; however, this contract was later terminated due to the absence of significant reserves. 

On 10 March 2010 it was reported that the German oil company RWE Dea signed a memorandum with SOCAR for developing the field. 

According to preliminary government estimates, the Nakhchivan field may contain up to 300 billion cubic meters of natural gas and 40 million tonne of natural gas condensate.

References

Oil fields of Azerbaijan
Natural gas fields in Azerbaijan
Caspian Sea